Sofie Marmont (born 11 January 1965; also known in marriage as Sofie Marmont-Nordlund) is a Swedish curler.

She was a long-time teammate with her sister Louise on Anette Norberg's team.

In 1989 she was inducted into the Swedish Curling Hall of Fame.

Teams

References

External links
 

Living people
1965 births
Swedish female curlers
Swedish curling champions